The 2011 European Trophy was the second European Trophy, a European ice hockey tournament held annually. It was also the sixth tournament since its predecessor, the Nordic Trophy, was launched in 2006. The regulation round began on 11 August 2011 and ended on 6 September 2011. The playoffs, which took place in Austria, were played between 16–18 December 2011 in the Eisarena Salzburg in Salzburg, and the Albert Schultz Eishalle in Vienna, at the same time as the 2011 Channel One Cup. The playoff hosts, Red Bull Salzburg, won the playoffs and captured their first championship title in the European Trophy tournament, having lost in the quarterfinals last year.

A significant difference in this year's tournament was that the number of participating teams was increased from 18 to 24. To compensate this, the teams were divided into four divisions this year, instead of just two in the previous year's tournament. Another difference was that the playoffs, known as the Red Bulls Salute, were not played at the same time as the regulation round—the regulation round was played between August–September 2011, while the playoffs were played in December, three months later. Further, the junior edition was disbanded prior to this year's tournament.

Tournament format 
The 24 teams in the tournament were, based on geographical location, divided into four divisions: the West Division, the North Division, the South Division, and the East Division. Each division consisted of 6 teams who played a round-robin in their division, and another three games against teams from the other three divisions (see the Division vs. Division games section), giving a total of 8 games per team. The top two teams of each division qualified for the playoffs, but as Red Bull Salzburg qualified for the playoffs as hosts (i.e. failed to reach one of the top two spots of the East Division), they replaced the worst second ranked team out of all four divisions, which was Eisbären Berlin.

Had at least two teams in the same division ended up tied in points, the following tie-breaker format was used:
Best goal difference
Most goals scored in total
Results in games against the tied teams
Drawing of lots

As Red Bull Salzburg, who were automatically qualified for the playoffs, failed to reach one of the top two spots of the East Division, the same tie-breaker format was used to determine which second ranked team they would replace, which was Eisbären Berlin.

Participating clubs

Regulation round

West Division 

All times for the games played in Finland are UTC+3, while all times for the other games are UTC+2.

North Division 

All times for the games played in Finland are UTC+3, while all times for the other games are UTC+2.

South Division 

All times are local (UTC+2).

East Division 

All times for the games played in Finland are UTC+3, while all times for the other games are UTC+2.

Division vs. Division games

West Division vs. North Division 
All times for the games played in Finland are UTC+3, while all times for the other games are UTC+2.

West Division vs. South Division 
Time for the game played in Finland is UTC+3, while all times for the other games are UTC+2.

West Division vs. East Division 
Time for the game played in Finland is UTC+3, while all times for the other games are UTC+2.

North Division vs. South Division 
All times are local (UTC+2).

North Division vs. East Division 
All times for the games played in Finland are UTC+3, while all times for the other games are UTC+2.

South Division vs. East Division 
Time for the game played in Finland is UTC+3, while all times for the other games are UTC+2.

Playoffs 
The playoffs are played as the Red Bulls Salute and take place in Salzburg and Vienna between 16–18 December 2011. The teams that lose the quarterfinals play in the classification games. The classification games decide which teams play in the respective games for 7th place and 5th place.

Venues

Bracket

Quarterfinals 
All times are local (UTC+1).

Classification games 
All times are local (UTC+1).

Semifinals 
All times are local (UTC+1).

7th place game 
Time is local (UTC+1).

5th place game 
Time is local (UTC+1).

Bronze medal game 
Time is local (UTC+1).

Gold medal game 
Time is local (UTC+1).

Ranking and statistics

Tournament awards

Final standings 
The final standings of the tournament:

Scoring leaders 
List shows the top skaters sorted by points, then goals. If the list exceeds 10 skaters because of a tie in points, all of the tied skaters are shown.
GP = Games played; G = Goals; A = Assists; Pts = Points; PIM = Penalties in minutes; POS = Position  positions: F = Forward; D = Defenceman
Sources: Europeantrophy.com and Eurohockey.com 
Updated as of the end of the tournament.

Leading goaltenders 
Only the top five goaltenders, based on save percentage, who have played 40% of their team's minutes, are included in this list.
TOI = Time on ice (minutes:seconds); SA = Shots against; GA = Goals against; GAA = Goals against average; Sv% = Save percentage; SO = Shutouts
Sources: Europeantrophy.com and Eurohockey.com 
Updated as of the end of the tournament.

European Star Award leaders
The European Star Award is a three stars award given to the three best players in each game. The first star gets three points, the second gets two points, and the third gets one point. List shows the top ten players based on the number of European Star Award points.
GP = Games played; Pts = Points; POS = Position  positions: G = Goaltender; F = Forward; D = Defenceman
Source: Europeantrophy.com 
Updated as of the end of the tournament.

Broadcasting rights

References

External links 
2011 European Trophy schedule
Playoff schedule at Red Bulls Salute's website

European Trophy
1